Back to Basics is the fifth solo album by former The Rolling Stones bassist Bill Wyman and his first since 1992's Stuff (from which Wyman re-recorded the song "Stuff (Can't Get Enough)" for this album). It was released in June 2015 under Proper Records.

Track listing
All tracks composed by Bill Wyman

Personnel
Bill Wyman - vocals, bass guitar, acoustic guitar on "Just a Friend of Mine", programmed drums on "I Lost My Ring", keyboards (tracks 7, 9, 10), piano (tracks 2-6, 8, 11, 12)
Terry Taylor - guitars, programmed drums on "I Lost My Ring"
Robbie McIntosh - additional guitars, ukulele on "November" and "Just a Friend of Mine"
Guy Fletcher - Hammond organ (tracks 1, 3-8, 10, 12), piano (tracks 3, 7, 9, 10), Wurlitzer electric piano (tracks 2, 5, 6, 8, 10-12)
Gavin Goldberg - programmed drums on "Love, Love, Love"
Frank Mead - horns (tracks 1-8, 11), harmonica on "I Got Time"
Nick Payn - horns (tracks 1-8), harmonica on "Seventeen", flute on "It's a Lovely Day"
Graham Broad - percussion on "Just a Friend of Mine"
Andy Wright - strings on "It's a Lovely Day", "breathing" vocal on "I Lost My Ring"
Beverley Skeete (tracks 1-4, 7, 8, 12), Clinton "Roachie" Outten (track 6), Gavin Goldberg (track 5) - backing vocals
Technical
Terry Taylor - production assistance
Andy Wright, Gavin Goldberg - additional production
Judy Totton - photography

References

2015 albums
Proper Records albums
Bill Wyman albums
Albums produced by Bill Wyman